Bartenheim is a commune in the Haut-Rhin department in Alsace in north-eastern France.

It is situated northwest of the EuroAirport Basel-Mulhouse-Freiburg, on the eastern edge of Sundgau. Bartenheim station has rail connections to Mulhouse and Basel.

See also
 Communes of the Haut-Rhin department

References

Communes of Haut-Rhin